Michael McLeod  (born September 6, 1959) is a Canadian politician, currently serving as a member of Parliament representing the Northwest Territories. He was first elected in the 2015 Canadian federal election, unseating Dennis Bevington, who was the incumbent New Democratic Party MP for the riding. McLeod was a former member of the Legislative Assembly of the Northwest Territories, Canada, as well as the former mayor of Fort Providence.

Political career
McLeod was born in Fort Providence, Northwest Territories. When he was 22, he served as a mayor of Fort Providence after being chosen by the local Dene council.

McLeod first ran for a seat in the 1999 Northwest Territories general election. He won an upset election defeating Speaker Samuel Gargan to win the Deh Cho electoral district. He was re-elected in the 2003 Northwest Territories general election winning a hotly contested election over challenger Michael Nadli by just 13 votes.

McLeod was returned by acclamation in the 2007 Northwest Territories general election, and served in cabinet as Minister of Transportation and Minister of Public Works and Services. He was defeated by Michael Nadli in the 2011 election.

After his defeat in 2011, McLeod became the director of the Mackenzie River Environmental Impact Review Board and worked to promote tourism in the South Slave for the territorial government. He won the Liberal Party of Canada nomination for the Northwest Territories riding for the 2015 Canadian federal election over Gail Cyr, after a third competitor, Kieron Testart, withdrew from the race and endorsed McLeod. On October 19, 2015, McLeod defeated New Democrat incumbent Dennis Bevington to win the seat.

McLeod was re-elected in the 2019 federal election.

His brother Bob McLeod was a member of the legislature and Premier of the NWT (2011–2019).

Electoral record

Federal

Territorial

References

External links

Michael McLeod biography

1959 births
20th-century Canadian politicians
21st-century Canadian politicians
20th-century First Nations people
21st-century First Nations people
Dene people
Indigenous Members of the House of Commons of Canada
Liberal Party of Canada MPs
Living people
Mayors of places in the Northwest Territories
Members of the Executive Council of the Northwest Territories
Members of the Legislative Assembly of the Northwest Territories
Métis politicians
Members of the House of Commons of Canada from the Northwest Territories